Toulon is a city on the south coast of France.

Toulon may also refer to:

 RC Toulonnais, a rugby union club in the French city
 Toulon-sur-Arroux, Saône-et-Loire, France
 Toulon, Illinois, United States
 Toulon, Kansas, United States
 Toulon, Nevada, United States
 Toulon Tournament, a soccer tournament
 Toulon (horse), a racehorse
 Mailu Island, known as Toulon Island, in Papua New Guinea